Wyoming Highway 375 (WYO 375), also known as Granger Road, is a short  state highway in Granger, Wyoming, United States, that connects the main part of town with U.S. Route 30 (US 30).

Route description
WYO 375 begins at an intersection with Walter Banks Drive, 3rd Street, and Pine Street, near the northeast edge of the main part of town. (Walter Banks Drive heads very briefly southeast before turning southwest for several blocks to end at Sweetwater County Road 16, near the north bank of Blacks Fork and southeast of the Granger Stage Station State Historic Site. Pine Street heads northwest for several blocks, passing by the post office, before ending 1st Street, just short of the several sets of tracks of the Union Pacific Railroad. 3rd Street heads southwest for one block to end at Cedar Street.) From its western terminus, WYO 375 heads northeast for its length as a two-lane road (running between the Union Pacific tracks and Blacks Fork) until it reaches its eastern terminus at a T intersection with US 30 in the northeastern part of Granger. (US 30 heads west toward Kemmerer and east toward Interstate 80 and Green River.)

Major intersections

See also

 List of state highways in Wyoming

References

External links

 Wyoming State Routes 300-399
 WYO 132 - US-287 to US-26/WYO 133

Transportation in Sweetwater County, Wyoming
375